Stanford Township is one of twelve townships in Clay County, Illinois, USA.  As of the 2010 census, its population was 599 and it contained 269 housing units.

Geography

Cities, towns, villages
 Clay City (west edge)
 Flora (east quarter)

Cemeteries
The township contains these five cemeteries: Bloom, Kneff, McCawley, Mount Zion United Brethren and Rusk.

Major highways
  US Route 45
  US Route 50

Airports and landing strips
 Flora Municipal Airport

Demographics

School districts
 Clay City Community Unit District 10
 Flora Community Unit School District 35
 North Clay Community Unit School District 25

Political districts
 Illinois' 19th congressional district
 State House District 108
 State Senate District 54

References
 
 United States Census Bureau 2007 TIGER/Line Shapefiles
 United States National Atlas

External links
 City-Data.com
 Illinois State Archives

Townships in Clay County, Illinois
Townships in Illinois